Patrice Luzi (born 8 July 1980) is a French former professional footballer who played as a goalkeeper. The longest stay in his career was his three years with Liverpool, which came to an end when he was released by the Anfield club in June 2005. He then signed a contract with the Belgian side R.E. Mouscron. In 2006, he moved from Mouscron to another Belgian club, Charleroi.

Having previously played for AS Monaco FC and AC Ajaccio, Luzi made his only appearance for Liverpool in January 2004 against Chelsea in a 1–0 win. His chances were limited when Liverpool brought in Southampton's Paul Jones on loan to cover Jerzy Dudek and Chris Kirkland.

References

External links
 Patrice Luzi's profile, stats & pics
 
 

1980 births
Living people
Sportspeople from Ajaccio
French footballers
Association football goalkeepers
Ligue 1 players
AS Monaco FC players
AC Ajaccio players
Premier League players
Liverpool F.C. players
Royal Excel Mouscron players
R. Charleroi S.C. players
Stade Rennais F.C. players
French expatriate footballers
French expatriate sportspeople in Belgium
Expatriate footballers in Belgium
French expatriate sportspeople in England
Expatriate footballers in England
Footballers from Corsica